Second Avenue Detour is the sixth album from Arthur Loves Plastic and was released in 2000.

The album is an electronic deconstruction of Lisa Moscatiello's solo album Second Avenue.

Awards
Second Avenue Detour won the 2000 Wammie for Best Recording in the Rock - Techno/Ambient/Electronic/Industrial Category.

Release notes
"ALP's most abstract, self-indulgent work to date. Ms. Arthur deconstructs the diva's solo album Second Avenue. Features a star-studded cast of performers."

Track listing

Personnel
 Remixed by Bev Stanton.

Additional musicians
 Lisa Moscatiello - Vocals
 Dave Chappell - Guitar
 Fred Lieder - Cello
 Chris Moscatiello - Piano
 Margaret Wolf - Harmonica
 Jaqui MacMillan - Percussion
 John Previti - Bass
 Brian Sims - Accordion
 Yves Duboin - Sax
 Sue Richards - Harp

Samples 
 Dialogue - Art Bell (12)

References

Arthur Loves Plastic albums
2000 albums